The first Lumbini Provincial Assembly was elected by the 2017 provincial elections. 87 members were elected to the assembly, 52 of whom were elected through direct elections and 35 of whom were elected through the party list proportional representation system. The term of the assembly started on 4 February 2018 and ended in September 2022. Shankar Pokharel from the CPN (UML) and Kul Prasad KC from the CPN (Maoist Centre) served as chief ministers during the term of the assembly. Purna Bahadur Gharti served as the speaker of the assembly and Krishni Tharu served as the deputy speaker.

Composition

Members

Changes

Defections

See also 

 Lumbini Province
 2017 Nepalese provincial elections

References 

Members of the Provincial Assembly of Lumbini Province